Harry Daniel was an Australian rules footballer.

Harry Daniel may also refer to:

Harry Daniel, protagonist of the film The Panman: Rhythm of the Palms
Harry Daniel  (1887–1958), Worshipful Master of the Acacia Lodge, buried in The British Cemetery Montevideo

See also

Henry Daniel (disambiguation)
Harold Daniell (1909–1967), motorcycle racer
Harry Daniels (1884–1953), VC recipient